The Ministry of Health is the government ministry responsible for the governance and guidance of healthcare in Laos.

References 

Ministries of the Government of Laos
Health in Laos
Laos